Pontoeciella is a monotypic genus of crustaceans belonging to the monotypic family Pontoeciellidae. The only species is Pontoeciella abyssicola.

The species is found in Pacific and Atlantic Ocean.

References

Siphonostomatoida
Monotypic crustacean genera